Tracey Anne Martin (born 1 July 1964) is a New Zealand politician and a former member of the New Zealand House of Representatives. Until 2021 she was a member of the New Zealand First Party, and served as its Deputy Leader from 2013 to 2015. She served as Minister for Children, Seniors, Internal Affairs and Associate Minister of Education from 2017 to 2020. Martin lost her seat in Parliament during the 2020 New Zealand general election.

Prior to entering Parliament
Martin has Māori ancestry through her maternal grandfather, with ties to Ngāti Kahungunu. Her pre-children profession was as a Credit Controller. For the next 15 years, prior to entering Parliament, Martin was a stay at home parent and was very active in the Warkworth community. She spent a significant amount of time on parent-based fundraising and volunteer committees for Mahurangi Kindergarten, Warkworth Primary School and Mahurangi College.

In her own time, outside of Parliament, Martin served as the chair of the board of trustees at Mahurangi College for over a decade before resigning when she became the Associate Minister for Education in 2018.

Political career

Martin has been involved with New Zealand First since the party started in 1993, and has been a member of its board of directors since 2008. 
She was selected as a candidate for the 2008 general election. She successfully stood for the Rodney Local Board during the 2010 Auckland Council elections.

Fifth National Government, 2011–2017
Martin was first elected to the New Zealand House of Representatives during the 2011 general election and was subsequently appointed as deputy leader of New Zealand First. She was first elected to Parliament as a New Zealand First list MP based in Warkworth, in 2011.

Along with all other New Zealand First MPs, Martin voted against the Marriage Amendment Act, which permits same-sex marriage in New Zealand, in 2013. New Zealand First requested that the bill become a referendum issue however the request was denied.

During the 2014 general election, Martin was re-elected to Parliament on the New Zealand First party list. The party won nine percent of the popular vote and eleven seats.

On 3 July 2015 it was announced that Martin had been replaced as deputy leader following a caucus vote and replaced by Ron Mark.

In 2015 Martin sponsored the Social Security (Clothing Allowances for Orphans and Unsupported Children) Amendment Bill. The bill gave unsupported child or orphan clothing allowance parity with foster children. She has also been a strong advocate for the expansion of this allowance so that it can be accessed by kin carers.

The party won 7.2 percent of the vote and nine seats.

Sixth Labour Government, 2017–2020
Following the formation of a Labour-NZ First coalition government, Martin was as appointed Minister for Children, Minister of Internal Affairs, Minister for Seniors, and Associate Minister of Education. Martin has also been NZ First spokesperson for broadcasting, communications and IT, education and women's affairs.

Within the coalition, Martin was seen by Labour MPs as a favourite to work with, and was often asked to act as a go-between for other MPs who were having trouble reaching resolutions. Martin also ensured appropriate people were involved in coalition management, including policy adviser and Martin's sister Kirsty Christison. In an interview after the coalition, Martin said, "We realised early in that we needed to get the conversations between NZ First, Labour and the Greens really tight. It had to be people who knew the party’s stand and policies and could speak with confidence about what the party was likely to accept and not accept, but were very apolitical. For NZ First, that person ended up being Kirsty.”

Following an attempted "uplifting" by Oranga Tamariki social workers of a child in Hastings in June 2019, the Minister for Children Martin met with local iwi Ngāti Kahungunu and the Māori Council. She also announced that the Government would be conducting a review into the Hawkes Bay attempted uplifting incident. In early August 2019, Martin announced that the Government would be scrapping its Children's Teams task forces in response to the uplifting controversy but rejected comparisons with the Australian "Stolen Generations".

According to media reports, Martin participated in several months of negotiations with the Labour Party over the Government's proposed Abortion Legislation Bill, which seeks to remove abortion from the Crimes Act 1961. Despite initially ruling out a referendum, NZ First leader Winston Peters surprised both Martin and Labour by demanding a binding referendum on abortion reform in return for supporting the legislation through Parliament. Peter's actions were criticised by both the Minister of Justice Andrew Little, who initiated the legislation, opposition National MP Amy Adams, and left-wing blogger Martyn "Bomber" Bradbury. Martin voted in favour of the Government's abortion legislation bill, which passed its first reading on 8 August 2019.

On 14 March 2020, it was reported that Martin was self-isolating and being tested for the COVID-19 virus after meeting with Australian Home Affairs Minister Peter Dutton, who had tested positive for the COVID-19 virus, during a Five Eyes ministerial meeting in Washington, D.C. the previous week.

During the 2020 New Zealand general election held on 17 October, Martin contested Ōhāriu, coming fifth place. She and her fellow NZ First MPs lost their seats after the party's vote dropped to 2.6%, below the five percent threshold needed to enter Parliament.

On 9 November 2020, Martin was granted retention of the title "The Honourable" for life, in recognition of her term as a member of the Executive Council.

Post-political life
In late January 2021, Martin along with fellow former MP Jenny Marcroft left New Zealand First, stating that the party needed to return to its roots and rebuild. In a 2022 interview Martin revealed she felt relief at New Zealand First's failure to be re-elected as she was contemplating leaving the party due to increasing policy differences. She stated that she was far closer to Labour politically than the majority of the New Zealand First caucus.

On 7 September 2021, Martin's former ministerial colleague Chris Hipkins announced her appointment as the Chair of the New Zealand Qualifications Authority. Martin is also a board member for the NZ Transport Agency.

Personal life
Martin and her husband have three children.

Martin has described her mother as the New Zealander that she most admires as a brave woman who has not been afraid to stand up for her belief and opinions.

Martin's grandfather was a guard at the Featherston prisoner of war camp during the Featherston Incident in 1943. His gun was taken by another member of staff who shot an interpreter at the camp by the name of Adachi. This incident started a riot in which 48 Japanese prisoners of war and one New Zealand guard died.

Martin has taken a pro-choice stance on abortion, supporting efforts to remove it from the Crimes Act 1961. Martin's views on abortion were affected by the death of her grandmother Beverley Williams during a backstreet abortion. In October 2020, The Spinoff online magazine described her as a liberal feminist and potential successor to Winston Peters who could broaden the party's appeal to women. Since leaving parliament, she is also writing a romance novel in her spare time.

References

External links

Profile on New Zealand Parliament website
Profile on NZ First website

|-

Living people
New Zealand First MPs
Women members of the New Zealand House of Representatives
New Zealand list MPs
Local politicians in New Zealand
Members of the New Zealand House of Representatives
Unsuccessful candidates in the 2008 New Zealand general election
21st-century New Zealand politicians
21st-century New Zealand women politicians
Candidates in the 2017 New Zealand general election
Members of the Cabinet of New Zealand
Women government ministers of New Zealand
Government ministers of New Zealand
Female interior ministers
Candidates in the 2020 New Zealand general election
Unsuccessful candidates in the 2020 New Zealand general election
1964 births
Māori MPs